Enric Casadevall Medrano  is an Andorran politician. He is a member of the Liberal Party of Andorra and Mayor of Canillo.

References

Members of the General Council (Andorra)
Living people
Year of birth missing (living people)
Mayors of places in Andorra
Liberal Party of Andorra politicians
People from Canillo